Jacek Paszulewicz (born 15 January 1977) is a Polish football manager who last worked as head coach of Widzew Łódź He is currently the chairman of III liga side Bałtyk Gdynia.

Career
Paszulewicz started his managerial career with Olimpia Grudziądz in the Polish I liga, a position he held until 2018. After that, he coached GKS Katowice and Widzew Łódź.

References

External links 
 Lightning on the pitch, ubiquitous corruption, whip coach. China through the eyes of Poles
 50 stories Jacek Paszulewicz builds one club, saves another and waits for an offer from the Premier League
 Jacek Paszulewicz: Chinese are hard to figure out 
 It was a positive year - interview with trainer Paszulewicz
 Jacek Paszulewicz: At the moment, the biggest problem in the 1st league is logistics

1977 births
Living people
Polish footballers
Association football defenders
ŁKS Łódź players
Polonia Warsaw players
Śląsk Wrocław players
Lechia Gdańsk players
Dyskobolia Grodzisk Wielkopolski players
Widzew Łódź players
Wisła Kraków players
Chengdu Tiancheng F.C. players
Olimpia Grudziądz managers
Polish expatriate footballers
Expatriate footballers in China
Górnik Zabrze players
Polish football managers
GKS Katowice managers
Widzew Łódź managers
I liga managers
II liga managers